Blepharomastix glaucoleuca is a moth in the family Crambidae. It is found in Peru and Bolivia.

The wingspan is 26–28 mm. The forewings are grey, with a faint lilac tinge. The hindwings are white with a fine dark grey terminal line.

References

Moths described in 1913
Blepharomastix